Water station may refer to:
 Water stop, a railroad facility for providing water to trains
 Water Station (organization), a California charitable organization
 Water Station, California, a former settlement in the Mojave desert